The murders of Gene and Eugene Thomas occurred in Wellington, New Zealand on 16 February 1994. Eugene, 68, and his son Gene, 30, were both investment and insurance brokers and owners of Invincible House at 136 The Terrace in Wellington.  Their bodies were discovered inside their offices at around 6.30pm by two cleaners. John Barlow was convicted after an unprecedented third murder trial, the first two trials ending in hung juries. The need for three trials caused controversy and raised questions about aspects of the New Zealand justice system.

John Barlow
Eugene Thomas's pocket diary revealed he had scheduled an appointment with a businessman named John Barlow for 6 pm on the day of the murders. An acquaintance of the Thomases, Barlow was an antiques dealer and a former manager to an insurance company. He was also a gun enthusiast who owned several handguns. Detectives interviewed Barlow on the afternoon of 17 February (the day after the murders), and he gave a statement.

Barlow's first statement
Barlow claimed that he had set up the after-hours meeting to make a business proposal to the Thomases regarding their business in reverse annuity mortgages.  He said that upon arriving at the Thomases' office at around 5:45 pm he had taken the lift up to the third floor of Invincible House where he was met by Gene Thomas.  Thomas apologized to Barlow for the fact his father was occupied with someone else in another meeting and suggested that they wait in the boardroom.  Eugene Thomas called his son into his office. When he returned, he asked Barlow to wait outside, as they needed the boardroom.  Barlow suspected that the Thomases did not want him in the boardroom in case he overheard something.  Barlow said he waited in the reception area until Thomas Junior came out and apologized, saying that they were "trying to get rid of" the person they were talking to, but didn't know how long that would take.  Barlow said he waited another ten minutes before he left and started to drive home at about 6:10 pm.  When he was halfway home, Barlow changed his mind and decided to return to the office to try and talk to the Thomases about his business idea.  He arrived back at their office at around 6:25 pm.  As he arrived at their office, Eugene Thomas called out "Is that you, John?" and when Barlow said "yes", he was told to call back in the morning.  Barlow claimed he did not see or hear anyone else.  Barlow mentioned that he saw an Asian boy cleaning the steps on the way out, and they said hello to one another.

This statement matched the story Barlow had told his wife earlier that morning.

Barlow's second statement
The following evening, 18 February, Barlow presented himself at the Wellington Central Police station to volunteer a second statement, saying he had not been entirely truthful in his first statement.  In his second statement Barlow claimed that after being told by Gene Thomas that there would not be a meeting, he had driven halfway home before deciding to return to try and talk with Eugene Thomas, as he had in his previous statement.  However, when he got to the office he saw Gene's body inside the reception area.  Barlow said he opened the door and saw that Thomas Junior was dead and there was blood everywhere.  Barlow then entered the boardroom where he saw Eugene lying back in his chair.  There was blood on his face and a telephone receiver in his hand.  Barlow said that he did not touch either of the bodies.  He said he then left the building, saying hello to the Asian cleaner on his way out.  This would have been about 6:35 pm.

He said that he did not tell the police everything in his first statement because he was in "extreme shock" and was fearful of being blamed.

Police investigation
The police were skeptical of Barlow's statements.  They had searched Barlow's house and then car, where they found a receipt from the Happy Valley rubbish landfill. At no time before the discovery of this receipt had Barlow mentioned to the police making a trip to the landfill on the morning of 17 February.  The police searched the landfill and discovered a CZ-27 Czech made pistol belonging to Barlow, as well as holster and a homemade silencer that had been cut into pieces, some Geco brand .32 bullets and an envelope with John Barlow's name and address on it.
It was determined that the pistol had been fitted with a homemade .22 barrel in place of the usual .32 calibre barrel. The .32 calibre barrel was never recovered.

Recorded conversation
After a press conference about the case, an associate of Barlow's approached the police.  This associate, who became a secret witness at Barlow's trials, agreed to wear a hidden microphone to record conversation with Barlow in the hope he might make incriminating statements. During these recorded conversations, Barlow's version of events stayed the same as his second statement to police but with one additional factor:  Barlow said that several months earlier he had lent the CZ-27 pistol to Thomas Senior, as Thomas had confided in him that he feared his life was being threatened. He also lent Thomas the homemade silencer so that he would be able to try out the gun discreetly the next time he was out of town. Barlow told the secret witness that when he found the Thomases dead that day, he was shocked to see his gun lying there on the floor.  Fearing that the weapon would be traced to him and that he would be blamed for the murders, he seized it and disposed of it the following morning.

First murder trial
Barlow was arrested on 23 June 1994, about 18 weeks after the killings. His first trial began at the Wellington High Court on 29 May 1995.  It lasted three weeks.  Barlow pleaded not guilty to the charge of double murder.

Prosecution's case
The prosecution's case was that Barlow went to the meeting with the Thomases that was arranged for 5:30 pm on Wednesday, 16 February.  It was not known for certain what the purpose of this meeting was.  The meeting was entered into five diaries and was known to a number of people. The prosecution said that the shootings took place after the meeting had been underway for an hour.  Barlow's fingerprints were found on a writing pad on the boardroom table.  It was disputed as to whether these prints were deposited whilst Barlow was tearing pages from the notepad. The page for 16 February had also been torn out of Thomas Senior's diary.  The prosecution alleged that was to destroy evidence of his appointment.

CZ-27 pistol
Central to the prosecution's case was that the CZ-27 pistol Barlow disposed of at the landfill was the murder weapon. It was believed that the murder weapon must have been fitted with a silencer, as otherwise the four shots would have been extremely loud, and no one in the vicinity at the time reported hearing any shots.
While it would have been possible to match up the bullets recovered from the crime scene by comparing rifling characteristics with the CZ-27's original barrel, this would prove impossible as Barlow had removed the barrel and disposed of it. Not only had the barrel been replaced, but Barlow had also filed down the firing pin and cartridge case extractor claws as well as substituting the original magazine with a homemade one.  The prosecution alleged that Barlow made these alterations in an attempt to prevent the identification of the CZ-27 pistol as the murder weapon. Peter Wilson, a forensic scientist from the Institute of Environmental Science and Research (ESR) testified that he compared the crime scene bullets with the bullets that Barlow had thrown away at the landfill and concluded that they matched.  One of the crime scene bullets was also sent to the Geco ammunition company in Germany, where a computer test confirmed not only was the bullet a Geco brand bullet, but that it was chemically identical to one of the bullets taken from the box of ammunition that Barlow had disposed of at the landfill.

Defence's case
The defence asserted that the Thomases were murdered by a third, unidentified person who used a different weapon, probably a revolver (as bullet cartridges were not found at the crime scene). The defence contended that although Barlow's gun had been found at the crime scene, it was not the murder weapon. The defence theorized that Thomas Senior had taken out the pistol that Barlow had lent him in some kind of an attempt to defend himself.  This was supported by the fact that Thomas Senior was found to have residue containing metallic elements, consistent with having fired or handled a weapon in the three hours before his death.
The defence pointed out that there was nothing that physically connected Barlow with the killing and despite having tested Barlow's wardrobe, his car, his watch and his eyeglasses – a total of 180 articles – scientists did not find anything that linked him to the homicides.  The defence said that Barlow's prints indicated nothing more than that he had been in the room – something that Barlow himself had admitted. A motive for the murders was not suggested by the prosecution, and although Barlow had taken out a loan of about $70,000 with the Thomases, there was nothing to suggest he was not in a position to repay it.

After deliberating for two and a half days, the jury decided that its members could not reach a unanimous decision.

Second murder trial
Barlow's second trial began on 24 July 1995.  In this trial the defence presented Robert Barnes, an expert from Melbourne, Australia, to challenge the prosecution.  He testified that the bullets which came from Thomas Senior's body did not necessarily come from the CZ-27, but could have come from a large number of similar weapons. He also questioned whether the cut-up silencer had been used. Most other aspects of Barlow's second trial were substantially the same as the first trial.

On 25 August, the jury retired to consider its verdict. After deliberating for two days the jury decided it could not reach a unanimous verdict.

Third murder trial
Barlow's third trial began on 24 October 1995.  During this trial, the prosecution presented an FBI expert, Charles Peters, whose test results showed that one murder bullet was unique and that the other three matched some of the bullets found at the landfill. Peters agreed with prosecutors that the compositions of three of the murder bullets were "analytically indistinguishable" from 14 of the landfill bullets. He furthermore stated that the crime scene bullets came from "the same box or a box manufactured on or, manufactured or loaded on or about," the same date as the landfill bullets. The defence once again presented Robert Barnes who disputed these findings.  Peters rejected the criticism.

Jury deliberations began on 20 November 1995.  After 27 hours of deliberation, the jury found John Barlow guilty of double murder. Barlow was sentenced to life imprisonment with a non-parole period of 14 years.

Appeals
Barlow appealed his convictions in August 1996. His lawyers argued that the third trial was intrinsically unfair under the Bill of Rights; that there were issues of non-disclosure of evidence; and that the trial judge had minimized the importance of the ballistics evidence which was at the heart of their defence argument in his summing up. Barlow's appeal was dismissed.

In 2006, the Governor General refused to grant Barlow a royal pardon.

Privy Council
In July 2008, Barlow's lawyer, Greg King, took the case to the Privy Council, who ruled to hear his appeal against conviction. This appeal centered on FBI expert Charles Peters' testimony. King argued that Peters' evidence was flawed and that his position as an FBI agent may have overly impressed the jury and influenced the weight they gave his testimony. An affidavit by Dr. Rick Randich, a metallurgist, gave the opinion that on the basis of the analysis undertaken by Peters, it was not possible to determine who manufactured the crime scene bullets. However, Randich agreed that lead fragments found at the crime scene were consistent with Geco ammunition. The Privy Council concluded that although Peters' evidence may have misled the jury, the circumstantial evidence against Barlow was "overwhelming". Barlow's appeal was subsequently dismissed.

Release from prison
After spending more than 15 years in jail, Barlow was paroled from Rimutaka prison. He maintains his innocence.

Citations

References
 

 

Murder in New Zealand
People murdered in New Zealand
1994 murders in New Zealand
Crime in Wellington